Nabil Zoubdi Touaizi (born 1 February 2001) is a Moroccan professional footballer who plays as a forward for Spanish club RCD Espanyol B.

Club career

Early career
Born in Santomera, Murcia, Touaizi joined Valencia's youth setup in 2014, from hometown side CF Santomera. On 31 January 2017, he moved abroad and joined Manchester City's Academy.

Espanyol
On 23 September 2020, Touaizi returned to his home country and signed a four-year deal with RCD Espanyol, being initially assigned to the reserves in Segunda División B. He made his senior debut on 18 October, coming on as a late substitute for Juan Camilo Becerra in a 2–1 home win over AE Prat.

Touaizi scored his first senior goal on 3 April 2022, netting the opener in a 2–0 home success over SD Formentera. He made his first team – and La Liga – debut on 13 August, replacing Vinícius Souza late into a 2–2 away draw against RC Celta de Vigo.

International career
After representing Spain at under-17 level, Touaizi switched allegiance to Morocco in September 2019. In 2021, he started to appear with the latter nation's under-20 side.

References

External links
 
 

2001 births
Living people
Footballers from the Region of Murcia
Moroccan footballers
Morocco youth international footballers
Spanish footballers
Spain youth international footballers
Spanish sportspeople of Moroccan descent
Association football forwards
La Liga players
Segunda División B players
Segunda Federación players
RCD Espanyol footballers
RCD Espanyol B footballers
Manchester City F.C. players
Spanish expatriate footballers
Moroccan expatriate footballers
Spanish expatriate sportspeople in England
Moroccan expatriate sportspeople in England
Expatriate footballers in England